Vanilla Beer (born 1950, Sheffield) is an English artist. She trained at the West Surrey School of Art and Design  and Walthamstow College of Art, London. Her first major solo show was at Gallery 181, curated by Alan Haydon in 1983. Her first major installation was commissioned by John Gill for the Royal Festival Hall in 1984. An installation at the De La Warr Pavilion took place in 1985. Since then she has had more than 100 exhibitions in England, North America, the Philippines (with British Council Support), France, Berlin and Ireland.

Vanilla Beer was a part-time lecturer at Lewisham College and Greenwich University, at Paris's Sorbonne and Cité University, occasionally at central London art schools. She was a reviewer for 'The Art Book' from 1997–2000. She was elected Fellow of the Printmakers Council in 1984, Holder of the Artescape Fellowship 1991-1992; She won the GLC Peace Year prize in 1983, Mail on Sunday Award 1991, Russell and Chapple Painting of the Month November 1996, Ray Finnis Award 1997, prize winner for short-listed installations at Deptford Creek, London and in County Mayo, Ireland. 2018 award Pix du Jury, Art a Magrie, France.

Personal life
Beer is one of eight children of the eminent cybernetician, Stafford Beer.

Publications

Prenez, Mangez et Vivez
Peacock University Press published a collection of essays on Beer's work in 2006. The publication, titled Prenez, Mangez et Vivez, was edited by Tony Mann and the essays were written by Beatrijs Lauwaert, Liane Lang and Ian Bolton.

Modern Mythmaker (2013)
An illustrated book with text by Zoey Goto, covers Beer's recent work which combines real life and myth.

Drawn by the Light of Burning Bridges (2015) 
Catalogue of drawings, reflections on art, notes on techniques.

Saints in Paint: A Mediation (2021)

Catalogue of a series of paintings of the mythic saints, examining the nature of inspiration.

References

1950 births
Living people
20th-century English painters
21st-century English painters
English printmakers
Academic staff of the University of Paris
Alumni of Walthamstow College of Art
Date of birth missing (living people)
Artists from Sheffield
20th-century British printmakers
Cyberneticists
Women cyberneticists